Franz Böheim (June 24, 1909 – March 24, 1963) was an Austrian film actor. Böheim appeared in more than fifty films and television series, including the 1947 film It's Only Love in which he played Franz Schubert. He was the brother of the actors Carlo Böhm and Alfred Böhm.

Selected filmography
 Anton the Last (1939)
 Immortal Waltz (1939)
 Beloved Augustin (1940)
 Late Love (1943)
 The Heart Must Be Silent (1944)
 Die Fledermaus (1946)
 It's Only Love (1947)
 The Heavenly Waltz (1948)
 Adventure in Vienna (1952)
 Arena of Death (1953)
 Grandstand for General Staff (1953)
 Marriage Sanitarium (1955)
 Mozart (1955)
 The Blue Danube (1955)

References

Bibliography 
 Mitchell, Charles P.  The Great Composers Portrayed on Film, 1913 Through 2002. McFarland & Company, 2004.

External links 
 

1909 births
1963 deaths
Austrian male film actors
Male actors from Vienna
20th-century Austrian male actors